Bilbster is a  rural area in the Highlands region of Scotland. Bilbster is a farming area. The River Wick, which is a productive salmon river, flows to the north of the settlement. A nearby wind farm was opened in 2008, consisting of three wind turbines that together are capable of generating 3.9 megawatts of electricity.

Bilbster railway station was closed in 1960.

References 

Populated places in Caithness
Wind farms in Scotland